A Judas goat is a trained goat used in general animal herding. The Judas goat is trained to associate with sheep or cattle, leading them to a specific destination. In stockyards, a Judas goat will lead sheep to slaughter, while its own life is spared. Judas goats are also used to lead other animals to specific pens and onto trucks. They have fallen out of use in recent times, but can still be found in various smaller slaughterhouses in some parts of the world, as well as conservation projects.

Cattle herders may use a Judas steer to serve the same purpose as a Judas goat. The technique, and the term,
originated from cattle drives in the United States in the 1800s.

The term is a reference to Judas Iscariot, an apostle of Jesus Christ who betrayed Jesus in the Bible.

Project Isabela in the Galàpagos Islands 
Project Isabela was a goat extermination initiative in the Galápagos Islands that started in 1997 and ended in 2006. Approximately 140,000 goats were living in the wild on the islands and threatening the local ecosystem. Goats were killed by gunmen in helicopters and by foot. Judas goats were used to lure the remaining goats to their death. The project cost 6 million dollars.

Goats tracking feral goats
The phrase has also been used to describe a goat that is used to find feral goats that are targeted for eradication. The Judas goat is usually sterilised, outfitted with a transmitter, painted in red and then released. The goat then finds the remaining herds of feral goats, allowing hunters to exterminate them. The popular podcast Radiolab dedicated a portion of its episode on the Galápagos Islands to how feral goats affected the environment on the islands and how Judas goats were used to help return the islands to nature.  This technique is now used to target other invasive species, such as camels in Australia, pigs in America, rats in Mexico and raccoon dogs in Europe.

See also
Scapegoat

References

Goats
Judas Iscariot
Herding